Badger Creek may refer to:

Badger Creek, Victoria, a town in Australia
Badger Creek (Des Moines River), a river in Iowa
Badger Creek (Blue Earth River), a river in Minnesota
Badger Creek (Houston County, Minnesota)
Badger Creek Wilderness, a wilderness area in Colorado